Grigory Suchkov (1917 – 1979) was a Soviet long-distance runner. He competed in the marathon at the 1952 Summer Olympics.

References

1917 births
1979 deaths
Athletes (track and field) at the 1952 Summer Olympics
Soviet male long-distance runners
Soviet male marathon runners
Olympic athletes of the Soviet Union
Place of birth missing